Bluevale (Sometimes labeled as Blue Valley) is a ghost town in York County, Nebraska, United States.

History
A post office was established at Bluevale in 1895, and was discontinued in 1901. Bluevale was an "inland" town, or a town without a railroad.

References

Ghost towns in Nebraska
Geography of York County, Nebraska